USCS Meredith was a schooner that served as a survey ship in the United States Coast Survey from 1851 to 1872.

Meredith was built in 1851 and entered service with the Coast Survey the same year. She operated along the United States East Coast during her career.

On the morning of 12 October 1856, Meredith was at anchor in Portland Harbor at Portland, Maine, when her crew spotted fishermen who were in danger of drowning when their boat was swamped while they were attempting to reach their fishing vessel. Merediths sailing master, Mr. John T. Hopes, with one of the crew, promptly pulled out and rescued the fishermen.

Meredith was retired from Coast Survey service in 1872.

References
NOAA History, A Science Odyssey: Tools of the Trade: Coast and Geodetic Survey Ships: Meredith
NOAA History, A Science Odyssey: Hall of Honor: Lifesaving and the Protection of Property by the Coast & Geodetic Survey 1845-1937

Ships of the United States Coast Survey
Schooners of the United States
1851 ships